Regina is a census-designated place (CDP)) in Sandoval County, New Mexico, United States. The population was 99 at the 2000 census. It is part of the Albuquerque Metropolitan Statistical Area. It was named for Regina, Saskatchewan.

Geography
Regina is located at  (36.194135, -106.942876).

Demographics

As of the census of 2000, there were 99 people, 47 households, and 32 families residing in the CDP. The population density was 13.6 people per square mile (5.3/km). There were 106 housing units at an average density of 14.6 per square mile (5.6/km). The racial makeup of the CDP was 80.81% White, 9.09% Native American, 6.06% from other races, and 4.04% from two or more races. Hispanic or Latino of any race were 15.15% of the population.

There were 47 households, out of which 19.1% had children under the age of 18 living with them, 61.7% were married couples living together, 2.1% had a female householder with no husband present, and 29.8% were non-families. 25.5% of all households were made up of individuals, and 12.8% had someone living alone who was 65 years of age or older. The average household size was 2.11 and the average family size was 2.48.

In the CDP, the population was spread out, with 14.1% under the age of 18, 2.0% from 18 to 24, 29.3% from 25 to 44, 36.4% from 45 to 64, and 18.2% who were 65 years of age or older. The median age was 47 years. For every 100 females, there were 110.6 males. For every 100 females age 18 and over, there were 102.4 males.

The median income for a household in the CDP was $13,355, and the median income for a family was $14,659. Males had a median income of $36,250 versus $42,813 for females. The per capita income for the CDP was $12,791. There were 14.0% of families and 18.2% of the population living below the poverty line, including no under eighteens and 33.3% of those over 64.

Education
Its district is Cuba Independent Schools.

See also

 List of census-designated places in New Mexico

References

External links

Census-designated places in Sandoval County, New Mexico
Great Divide of North America
Census-designated places in New Mexico
Albuquerque metropolitan area